Eubrianax edwardsii is a species of water penny beetle in the family Psephenidae. It is found in North America.

References

Further reading

 

Byrrhoidea
Articles created by Qbugbot
Beetles described in 1874